The Headies Award for Best R&B Single is an award presented at The Headies, a ceremony that was established in 2006 and originally called the Hip Hop World Awards. It was first presented to Banky W. in 2010.

Recipients

Category records
Most wins 

Most nominations

References 

The Headies